Courtelary District was located in Switzerland and was one of the three French-speaking districts of the Bernese Jura, along with La Neuveville and Moutier. The district was located in the canton of Bern with the seat being Courtelary. It had a population of about 22,224 in 2004. The three districts were merged on 1 January 2010 to form the new district of Jura Bernois with the capital at Courtelary.

References

Former districts of the canton of Bern